Antonio Zabálburu (born 19 July 1973 in Bilbao) is a Spanish actor. He is currently part of the cast of Hospital Central.

Television (selected)
Compañeros (1998)
Hospital Central (2000 - )

Film (selected)
Sabor latino (1996), directed by Pedro Carvajal
África (1996), directed by Alfonso Ungría
La marcha verde (2002), directed by José Luis García Sánchez
Eres mi heroe (2003), directed by Antonio Cuadri
Campos de luz (2004), directed by María Casal
Vete de mi (2006), directed by Víctor García León

External links

1973 births
Living people
Spanish male television actors
Spanish male film actors
People from Bilbao
20th-century Spanish male actors
21st-century Spanish male actors
Male actors from the Basque Country (autonomous community)